Hugo Nicolás Barbaro (December 12, 1950) is a prelate of the Roman Catholic Church. He serves as bishop of San Roque de Presidencia Roque Sáenz Peña since 2008.

Life 
Born in Vicente López, Barbarowas ordained to the priesthood on August 15, 1980.

On April 22, 2008, he was appointed bishop of San Roque de Presidencia Roque Sáenz Peña. Barbaro received his episcopal consecration on the following July 4 from Jorge Mario Bergoglio, archbishop of Buenos Aires, the later pope Francis, with bishop emeritus of San Roque de Presidencia Roque Sáenz Peña, José Lorenzo Sartori, and bishop of Santiago del Estero, Francisco Polti Santillán, serving as co-consecrators. He was installed as bishop on July 26, 2008.

External links 
 catholic-hierarchy.org, Bishop Hugo Nicolás Barbaro

1950 births
21st-century Roman Catholic bishops in Argentina
Living people
Roman Catholic bishops of San Roque de Presidencia Roque Sáenz Peña